Hyaleucerea grandis is a moth of the subfamily Arctiinae. It was described by William Schaus in 1921. It is found in Ecuador.

References

Euchromiina
Moths described in 1921